The discography of the Luniz consists of four studio albums, two compilations and two charting singles.

Albums

Studio albums

Compilation albums

Extended plays

Mixtapes

Singles

References 

Hip hop discographies
Discographies of American artists